Chara canescens is a species of stonewort belonging to the family Characeae.

Its native range is Europe and Northern America.

References

Charophyta